DXOW (981 AM) Radyo Pilipino is a radio station owned and operated by Radyo Pilipino Media Group through its licensee Radyo Pilipino Corporation. The station's studio is located along F. Torres St., Davao City.

History
Established in 1962 under the call letters DXMT, it was the first Golden Sound in the airwaves of Davao City. At that time, it was owned by former Sen. Rene Espina under Mindanao Times. Years later, it carried the slogan Sariling Atin. On June 15, 1980, RadioCorp acquired the station and changed its call letters to DXOW. During its first 5 years, it was among the top stations in the city.

References

Radio stations in Davao City
News and talk radio stations in the Philippines
Radio stations established in 1962